The United States of Africa is a hypothetical concept of a federation of some or all of the 54 sovereign states and two disputed states on the continent of Africa. The concept takes its origin from Marcus Garvey's 1924 poem "Hail, United States of Africa".

Origins

The idea of a multinational unifying African state has been compared to various medieval African empires, including the Ethiopian Empire, the Ghana Empire, the Mali Empire, the Songhai Empire, the Benin Empire, the Kanem Empire and other historic nation states. During the late 19th and early 20th century the majority of African land was controlled by various European empires, with the British controlling around 30 percent of the African population at its peak.

The term "United States of Africa" was mentioned first by Marcus Garvey in his poem Hail, United States of Africa in 1924. Garvey's ideas and formation systems deeply influenced former Africa leaders and the rebirth of the African Union.

2009–2011 proposals

In February 2009, upon being elected chairman of the 53-nation African Union in Ethiopia, Gaddafi told the assembled African leaders: "I shall continue to insist that our sovereign countries work to achieve the United States of Africa." The BBC reported that Gaddafi had proposed "a single African military force, a single currency and a single passport for Africans to move freely around the continent". Other African leaders stated they would study the proposal's implications, and re-discuss it in May 2009.

The focus for developing the United States of Africa so far has been on building subdivisions of Africa - the proposed East African Federation can be seen as an example of this. Former President of Senegal, Abdoulaye Wade, had indicated that the United States of Africa could exist as early as 2017. The African Union, by contrast, has set itself the task of building a "united and integrated" Africa by 2025. Gaddafi had also indicated that the proposed federation may extend as far west as the Caribbean: Haiti, Jamaica, the Dominican Republic, the Bahamas and other islands featuring a large African diaspora, may be invited to join.

Gaddafi also received criticism for his involvement in the movement, and lack of support for the idea from among other African leaders. A week before Gaddafi's death during the Libyan Civil War, South African President Jacob Zuma expressed relief at the regime's downfall, complaining that Gaddafi had been "intimidating" many African heads of state and government in an effort to gain influence throughout the continent and suggesting that the African Union will function better without Gaddafi and his repeated proposals for a unitary African government.

After the death of Gaddafi
Gaddafi was ultimately killed during the Battle of Sirte in October 2011. While some regard the project to have died with him, Robert Mugabe expressed interest in reviving the project. Following the 2017 Zimbabwean coup d'état, Mugabe resigned as President. On 6 September 2019, Mugabe died.

National views
The governments of Ghana, Senegal, and Zimbabwe, have supported an African federation. Others such as South Africa, Kenya, and Nigeria have been more skeptical, feeling that the continent is not ready for integration. North African countries such as Algeria, Morocco, Egypt, Tunisia, and post-revolution Libya who have traditionally identified more with rival ideologies like Arab nationalism, Berberism and Islamism have shown less interest in the idea making it difficult for the Arabic, Berber and Islamic North Africa to merge with Sub Saharan Africa.

Doubts have been raised about whether the goal of a unified Africa can ever be achieved despite many languages being spoken while ongoing problems of corruption, conflict, tribalism, civil unrest and poverty persist throughout the continent and continue to plague the people.

Demographics
The proposed federation would have the largest total territory of any state, exceeding the Russian Federation. It would also be the third most populous state after China and India, and with a population speaking an estimated 2,000 languages.

In fiction
In the fictional Star Trek universe, the United States of Africa exist as part of the United Earth Government. Commander Nyota Uhura hails from Kenya, within the United States of Africa; Geordi La Forge's home city, Mogadishu in Somalia, is in the African Confederation (it is unknown whether they are intended to be the same organization).

In the fictional Halo universe, the United States of Africa exist as a nation of the United Earth Government, within the United Nations Space Command.

Arthur C. Clarke's 1987 science fiction novel 2061: Odyssey Three features the formation of a United States of Southern Africa.

The 2006 French-Beninese film Africa Paradis is set in the United States of Africa in the year 2033.

The 1990s cartoon Bots Master has a United States of Africa, and its President is one of the few people who believes that Ziv "ZZ" Zulander is not a terrorist.

In Kodwo Eshun's Further Considerations on Afrofuturism (2003) a team of United States of Africa (USAF) archaeologists from the future attempt to reconstruct 20th-century Afrodiasporic subjectivity through a comparative study of various cultural media and artefacts.

See also
 African Union
 Arab Union
 Demographics of Africa
 Federal Europe
 Organisation of African Unity
 Pan-African Parliament
 United States of Europe
 United States of Latin Africa
 Universal Negro Improvement Association and African Communities League

References

African Union
Continental unions
Pan-Africanism in Africa
Proposed political unions
1924 introductions